The mixed 2×6 kilometre + 2×7.5 kilometre relay at the 2017 Asian Winter Games was held on February 25, 2017 at the Nishioka Biathlon Stadium.

Schedule
All times are Japan Standard Time (UTC+09:00)

Results
Legend
DNF — Did not finish
DSQ — Disqualified

References

Results

External links
Official website

Mixed relay